Morafeno is a rural municipality in Madagascar. It belongs to the district of Befandriana-Nord, which is a part of Sofia Region. The population of the commune was estimated to be approximately 21,000 in 2001 commune census.

Only primary schooling is available. It is also a site of industrial-scale  mining. The majority 98% of the population of the commune are farmers, while an additional 2% receives their livelihood from raising livestock. The most important crop is rice, while other important products are peanuts, maize and cassava.

References 

Populated places in Sofia Region